PARC or Parc may refer to:

Biology
 PARC (gene), a eukaryotic gene/protein
 parC, a bacterial gene coding for subunit A of topoisomerase IV
 Pulmonary and activation-regulated chemokine, a former name for the protein CCL18

Clubs
 Pays d'Aix Rugby Club, former name of the French rugby union club now known as Provence Rugby

Entertainment
 Parc, an alias of the Swedish trance artist Jezper Söderlund
 Parc (film), a 2008 film

Organizations
 PARC (company), the Palo Alto Research Center (formerly Xerox PARC)
 PARC Management, a theme park and entertainment venue operator
 Pakistan Agricultural Research Council
 Photography and the Archive Research Centre, an organisation within University of the Arts London
 Partners in Amphibian and Reptile Conservation, an organization initiated by the Savannah River Ecology Laboratory devoted to conservation of amphibians and reptiles
 Portland Anarchist Road Care, a road maintenance organization based in Portland, Oregon
 President's Appalachian Regional Commission, a predecessor of the Appalachian Regional Commission

Places
 Parc, New York, a census-designated place named for the Plattsburgh Airbase Redevelopment Corporation
 Parc, Penrhyndeudraeth, a ruined mansion once owned by the Anwyl of Tywyn Family of Gwynedd, Wales
 Parc (HM Prison), a prison in South Wales
 Arctic Village Airport (ICAO: PARC), an airport in Arctic Village, Alaska

Other
 Parco (disambiguation)

See also
 Parc station (disambiguation)